The Greenbrier River Trail (GRT), is a lineal state park comprising a  rail trail between North Caldwell and Cass in eastern West Virginia.

The GRT route and its contours were originally engineered by the Chesapeake and Ohio Railway, serving as a passenger and freight line before becoming unviable after the Great Depression. The right of way was gifted to the State of West Virginia in the late 1970s and the former railbed reopened in 1980 as a recreational multi-use trail.

The wheelchair-accessible trail features a hard-packed crushed-limestone surface accommodating hiking, bicycling, ski-touring and horseback-riding. Access is provided at 14 trailheads. The route features 16 primitive campsites (several with three-sided camping shelters), 50 to 60 picnic tables, and passes three state parks and two state forests.

In 1999, the GRT was one of 50 trails in the United States designated a Millennium Legacy Trail. In 2012, the trail was elected to the National Rail Trail Hall of Fame and was named by Backpacker magazine as "one of the Top 10 hiking trails in the United States."

Background
The GRT follows portions of the Chesapeake and Ohio Railway's former Greenbrier Division constructed between North Caldwell and Cass in 1899 and 1900. The route was used heavily in the 1920s for through traffic via its connection with the Western Maryland Railway at Durbin, serving quarries, sawmills and tanneries as well as agricultural and livestock operations. The line hit its peak peacetime tonnage in 1926.

By the 1930s rail traffic waned, with the coming of improved roads and the depletion of timber tracts. Passenger service ended January 8, 1958, and freight service ended in December 1978, with the line being officially abandoned December 29, 1978.

The Chesapeake and Ohio donated most of its right-of-way south of Durbin, including the land that became the Greenbrier River Trail, to the State of West Virginia on June 20, 1980. A contractor for the railroad removed the track south of Cass in 1979–1980 and the state purchased the track from Cass to Durbin for its scrap value to be used by the Cass Scenic Railroad.

Trailheads

See also
Cycling infrastructure
Greenbrier County
Pocahontas County
High Bridge Trail State Park
New River Trail State Park
Virginia Capital Trail
Fall Line Trail
Virginia Creeper Trail
Washington & Old Dominion Trail

References

External links
 
Greenbrier River Trail Association web page
West Virginia Rails-to-Trails page
Hiking and Biking Map of the Greenbrier River Trail
Greenbrier River Watershed Association
Greenbrier River Trail at Trailink
HawkinsRails Greenbrier River Trail page

Protected areas of Greenbrier County, West Virginia
Protected areas of Pocahontas County, West Virginia
Rail trails in West Virginia
State parks of West Virginia
Transportation in Greenbrier County, West Virginia
Transportation in Pocahontas County, West Virginia
Long-distance trails in the United States